Vivian Charles Lewis St Clair Parkinson (3 July 1882 – 22 March 1944) was an Australian rules footballer who played with St Kilda in the Victorian Football League (VFL).

Notes

External links 

1882 births
1944 deaths
Australian rules footballers from Victoria (Australia)
St Kilda Football Club players